Flordon Common is a  biological Site of Special Scientific Interest south-east of Wymondham in Norfolk. It is a registered common part of the Norfolk Valley Fens Special Area of Conservation.

Springs emerge from this chalk valley of the River Tas, resulting in a species-rich calcareous fen, including the very rare narrow-mouthed whorl snail. On higher ground there is chalk grassland, which is traditionally managed by grazing, allowing the survival of many locally rare plants.

The common is open to the public.

References

Sites of Special Scientific Interest in Norfolk
Special Areas of Conservation in England